Luke Owens (October 9, 1933 – December 9, 2016) was an American football defensive lineman in the NFL for the Baltimore Colts and the Chicago/St. Louis Cardinals. Owens played college football at Kent State University.

References

1933 births
2016 deaths
People from Stuttgart, Arkansas
Players of American football from Arkansas
American football defensive linemen
Kent State Golden Flashes football players
Baltimore Colts players
Chicago Cardinals players
St. Louis Cardinals (football) players